Oeversee is an Amt ("collective municipality") in the district of Schleswig-Flensburg, in Schleswig-Holstein, Germany. The seat of the Amt is in Tarp.

The Amt Oeversee consists of the following municipalities:

Oeversee 
Sieverstedt 
Tarp

Ämter in Schleswig-Holstein